Produce 101 Japan (season 2) is Japanese reality competition show and a spin-off of the South Korean television series Produce 101. 101 trainees, aged 15–27 years old who are not affiliated with any talent agency, will be competing to debut in an 11-member boy band, with members selected by live voting from the viewers.

Contestants

The spelling of names in English is according to the official website. The Japanese contestants are presented in Western order (given name, family name), while the names of the foreign contestants are presented in Eastern order (family name, given name).

Color key

Group Battle Evaluation Performances (Episode 3-4)

Color key

Bold denotes the person who picked the team members.

Position Battle Evaluation Performances (Episode 6-7)

Color key

The first-place trainee in each group will receive a bonus of 10,000 votes, with the exception of the hidden song, where the first place will gain a 20,000 vote bonus. The first-place trainee overall in each category will receive a 100,000 vote bonus.

Concept Evaluation Performances (Episode 8)

Color key

Members of each group are selected by audience vote on their official website between the broadcasts of episodes 5 and 6 (May 6 at 11:00 PM to May 11 at 11:59 PM (JST)). The winning group receives a total of 240,000 additional votes that is split based on each contestant's ranking: the contestant with the most votes receives 100,000 votes, while the remaining contestants receive 20,000 votes. The number of live votes and rankings were not announced.

Debut Evaluation Performances (Episode 10)

Color key

Notes

References

 
Produce 101 Japan contestants
Produce 101 Japan contestants
Produce 101 Japan contestants
Produce 101 Japan contestants